Centrin-1 is a protein that in humans is encoded by the CETN1 gene. It belongs to the centrin family of proteins.

The protein encoded by this gene plays important roles in the determination of centrosome position and segregation, and in the process of microtubule severing. This encoded protein is localized to the centrosome of interphase cells, and redistributes to the region of the spindle poles during mitosis, reflecting the dynamic behavior of the centrosome during the cell cycle.

References

External links

Further reading

EF-hand-containing proteins